Mount Shëndelli (lit. "Mount Holy-Sun") is a mountain in southern Albania in the geographical region of Southern Albanian Highlands. It is part of the mountain chain Shëndelli-Lunxhëri-Bureto chain, which goes parallel to the Trebeshinë-Dhembel-Nemërçkë chain. Its highest elevation is 1,802 m. Its orientation is north to south. The valley of the river Vjosë, with the city Tepelenë, lies to its south and west.

Folklore
The mountain is considered by Albanians as a sacred place. In local folk beliefs it is associated with the cult of the mountain peaks and the cult of the sun.

References

Bibliography

Mountains of Albania